The 2017–18 Missouri State Bears basketball team represented Missouri State University during the 2017–18 NCAA Division I men's basketball season. The Bears, led by seventh-year head coach Paul Lusk, played their home games at JQH Arena in Springfield, Missouri as members of the Missouri Valley Conference. Despite being the preseason favorite in the MVC, the Bears finished the season 18–15, 7–11 in MVC play to finish in a three-way tie for seventh place. As the No. 7 seed in the MVC tournament, they beat Valparaiso in the first round before losing to Southern Illinois in the quarterfinals.

On March 3, 2018, the school announced that head coach Paul Lusk had been fired. He finished at Missouri State with a seven-year record of 106–121. The school announced that former Tennessee State head coach Dana Ford had been named head coach of the Bears on March 21.

Previous season 
The Bears finished the 2016–17 season 17–16, 7–11 in MVC play to finish in a tie for sixth place. As the No. 6 seed in the MVC tournament, they defeated Northern Iowa in the quarterfinals before losing to Wichita State in the semifinals.

Offseason

Departures

Incoming transfers

2017 recruiting class

Preseason
In the conference's preseason poll, the Bears were picked to win the MVC, receiving 30 of 40 first place votes. Senior forward Alize Johnson was named the preseason MVC Player of the Year.

Roster

Schedule and results

|-
!colspan=9 style=| Exhibition

|-
!colspan=9 style=| Non-conference regular season

|-
!colspan=9 style=| Missouri Valley regular season

|-
!colspan=9 style=| Missouri Valley tournament

Source

References

Missouri State Bears basketball seasons
Missouri State
Missouri State, basketball men
Missouri State, basketball men